Ronald Jeremy Hyatt (born March 12, 1953) is an American former pornographic actor.

Nicknamed "The Hedgehog", Jeremy was ranked by AVN at No. 1 in their "50 Top Porn Stars of All Time" list. Jeremy has also made a number of non-pornographic media appearances, and director Scott J. Gill filmed a documentary about him and his legacy, Porn Star: The Legend of Ron Jeremy, which was released on November 30, 2001 worldwide and on home media and digital download on March 25, 2003.

Jeremy has been accused of sexual assault more than a dozen times over the years. In June 2020, Jeremy was charged with four counts of rape and sexual assault involving four women, and in August 2020, he was charged with another 20 counts of either rape or sexual assault over a span of 16 years from 2004 to 2020 that involved 12 women and a 15-year-old girl. Upon further investigation he was indicted on 30 sexual-assault counts involving 21 victims, and as a result he was jailed while awaiting trial. In January 2023, he was found by the court to be mentally unfit to stand trial due to "incurable neurocognitive decline".

Early life 
Ronald Jeremy Hyatt was born in Queens, New York City, to a middle-class Jewish family from Russia and Poland. His father, Arnold (born 1918), was a physicist and professor at Queens College, CUNY, and his mother a book editor who had served in the O.S.S. during World War II, as she spoke fluent German and French.

He graduated from Benjamin N. Cardozo High School. After high school, Jeremy attended Queen's College, CUNY, where he majored in theater and education as an undergraduate and completed a master's degree.

Pornographic film career 

Jeremy left the teaching profession (he called it his "ace in the hole") to pursue a legitimate acting career on Broadway. He has said that he learned then what it was like to be broke, making no money as an actor who "starved Off-Broadway". Jeremy soon found work posing for Playgirl after his then-girlfriend submitted his photo to the magazine. Jeremy utilized this opportunity as a springboard into the adult film industry, which he viewed as a reliable means of supporting himself.

Jeremy had the nickname "The Hedgehog" bestowed upon him by fellow porn actor William Margold in 1979 after a situation on the set of the porn film Olympic Fever. Jeremy flew in from New York to shoot the movie. Expecting warm California weather, he wore only a T-shirt and shorts and brought no additional clothing. During the long motorcycle ride to the set, located near Lake Arrowhead, in the California mountains, the weather deteriorated to blizzard conditions, which chilled him to the point of near hypothermia. Upon arriving at the set, Jeremy was immediately whisked away to thaw out in a hot shower. When he finished, his skin had taken on a pinkish hue from the temperature extremes, and all the many hairs on his body were standing on end. Margold's comment upon seeing Jeremy at that moment was "You are a hedgehog, my friend. A walking, talking hedgehog." Contrary to popular belief, the nickname had nothing to do with his weight, as he was quite physically fit at the time.

Jeremy is listed in the Guinness Book of World Records for "Most Appearances in Adult Films"; his entry on the Internet Adult Film Database lists more than 2,000 films in which he has performed, and an additional 285 films which he directed. By way of comparison, John Holmes, the next highest-ranked male star on the AVN Top 50 porn stars, has 384 acting credits listed on the IAFD.

One joke that made the rounds within the industry at the time was "the kinkier acts some actresses would not perform were bestiality, sadomasochism, and sex with Jeremy" because he had an atypical appearance for a porn star.

In 2006, Jeremy began a series of debates on pornography opposing Pastor Craig Gross, founder of anti-pornography website XXXchurch.com, visiting various U.S. and Canada college campuses as part of the "Porn Debate Tour".

Non-pornographic appearances

Film 
Outside the adult film industry, Jeremy worked as a "special consultant" for the 1986 film 9½ Weeks. He appears in the 1996 horror film They Bite in a role making a film-within-a-film (Invasion of the Fishfuckers) – another horror film, both in the same vein as Humanoids from the Deep.  He also served as a consultant on the 1997 film Boogie Nights—which chronicled the emergence of the fictional porn star Dirk Diggler (Mark Wahlberg, loosely based on the life of porn star John Holmes, who had been a co-worker of Jeremy's)—and the movie The Chase, in which he has a small cameo as a news cameraman. He played the monster "Blisterface" in ABC's children's show Bone Chillers. He also appeared in the 1999 film The Boondock Saints, played a bartender in 2002's Spun and acted in 2003's Zombiegeddon. He was an extra in Ghostbusters, played a male strip-club announcer in Detroit Rock City, and had a cameo in Killing Zoe and in the porn spoof, Orgazmo. In addition, he appeared in several productions released by Troma Entertainment, such as Terror Firmer, Citizen Toxie: The Toxic Avenger IV and Poultrygeist.

He was the subject of a feature-length biographical documentary, Porn Star: The Legend of Ron Jeremy, released in 2001 and widely distributed on DVD by mainstream retailers. In that same year he is briefly seen on the heavy metal band Fear Factory's DVD Digital Connectivity. In 2003, Jeremy appeared as himself in, and lent his name to, the comedy film Being Ron Jeremy, a parody of Being John Malkovich. Jeremy is a frequent interviewee in documentaries about the porn industry, or related subjects such as Fuck: A Fuckumentary.

He was featured in the music video "The Plot to Bomb the Panhandle" by A Day to Remember in 2007 from their CD entitled For Those Who Have Heart. In 2007, he appeared in the comedy film Finishing the Game as himself. Jeremy starred in 2008 in the erotic horror film I Am Virgin, which was released in 2010.

Jeremy has a cameo in Crank: High Voltage, playing himself as a protester angry at the low salaries porn stars get. Another 2009 cameo was in "Stripper: Natasha Kizmet". He once again appears as himself in the 2009 release One-Eyed Monster, a horror film parody predicated on the premise that an alien force takes over Jeremy's penis and begins killing people in the woods.

Jeremy is the Lead Antagonist/League Owner in the sports comedy Tetherball: The Movie and appeared in the western comedy Big Money Rustlas featuring Insane Clown Posse in 2010.

Television 
In 1980, Jeremy competed on the game show Wheel of Fortune, using his real last name, as Ron Hyatt. Among his winnings was a trip to Mazatlán.

Jeremy appeared in the second season of The Surreal Life, during which he developed a close friendship with Tammy Faye Bakker despite her devout Christianity and disapproval of pornography, and returned to the franchise for the ninth season of The Surreal Life: Fame Games, in which he finished second to Traci Bingham on the season finale, which aired on March 25, 2007. Jeremy also appeared in a segment on Comedy Central's Chappelle's Show. Additionally, he made appearances on Penn and Teller's Bullshit! in episodes regarding penis enlargement and circumcision. In 2005, he appeared on the UK reality TV show, The Farm. Jeremy also made a brief cameo on Lewis Black's Root of All Evil, in the episode "YouTube VS Porn", in a short segment where people on the street were shown a video of hardcore pornography, and Jeremy was the only one disgusted by the video.

Jeremy was seen in the Robot Chicken episode, "A Piece of the Action", in which he was voiced by Michael Benyaer. In the episode, he and several others parody The Surreal Life and The Lord of the Rings. The segment lampoons his penis size by having his character unseat a knight on horseback using nothing but his erect penis. Jeremy appeared as himself in the 2001 Family Guy episode "Brian Does Hollywood", in which he is a presenter at an adult industry award show in which Brian Griffin is a nominee. Comedian Kathy Griffin went on a date with him in the third season of her reality show, Kathy Griffin: My Life on the D-List. Jeremy has also appeared in a part on the Comedy Central show Tosh.0.

In 2003, Jeremy appeared on The Frank Skinner Show and performed a duet ("I Got You Babe") with former Cabinet minister Mo Mowlam. Jeremy appeared on Chappelle's Show as himself in a spoof called "What if the Internet was a real place?", in which he asks Dave Chappelle if he would like to see some of his films. Jeremy also appeared as a guest commentator on the Fox News Channel late-night news and comedy talk show Red Eye w/ Greg Gutfeld in 2007. In the "Super Karate Monkey Death Car" episode of Newsradio, Jeremy can be seen sitting in the audience at Jimmy James's reading, along with Brian Posehn. Jeremy appeared in Tosh.0 as the falling prom girl's date. Jeremy appeared on Anthony Bourdain: No Reservations, as himself, in Bourdain's "Food Porn" (Season 5) and "Food Porn 2" (Season 6) episodes. Jeremy appeared on Silent Library in 2010. In the show, he was the "Mystery Creature" that was concealed underneath a sheet in a cage, the contestant has to feed him carrots while being blindfolded.

Music 
Jeremy has appeared in videos by Sublime, Mercury Rev, Moby, Insane Clown Posse, Kid Rock, LMFAO, Everclear, Sam Kinison, Guns N' Roses, Mad Yellow Sun, Los Umbrellos, XXX Rottweiler Hundar (Icelandic), the Radioactive Chicken Heads, A Day To Remember, Escape The Fate, Christina Linhardt, Necro, Flight of the Conchords, My Darkest Days, Armin Van Buuren, Loud Luxury, The Meices, and Steel Panther. In addition, he released a rap single called "Freak of the Week" which peaked at 95 on the Billboard rap charts; a music video for this was also produced. Jeremy introduced Boston ska punk band Big D and the Kids Table at the 2011 and 2013 Vans Warped Tour in Carson, California, and Ventura, California, respectively, and also appeared in their new video for the song "One Day". In 2001, he made a small appearance in industrial/groove metal band Fear Factory's DVD Digital Connectivity, where he welcomes the viewer, in the "Digimortal" portion of the DVD, "to the world of Fear Factory". In 2008, Brooklyn rap artist Necro featured Ron as well as Jack Napier, Rebeca Linares, and several others for the videos "Who's Ya Daddy" and "I Wanna F**k". In 2011, he appeared in LMFAO's music video for the song "Sexy And I Know It". In 2011, he also appeared on the rap group Bankrupt Records album Double Vision on the skit "The Ron Jeremy Call".

In 2012, he appeared in Canadian rock band My Darkest Days music video for their song "Casual Sex". In 2013, he appeared in the music video for the song "This Is What It Feels Like" by famous DJ Armin van Buuren, later in the year he appeared in a parody of the music video for Miley Cyrus's "Wrecking Ball" by YouTuber Bart Baker.

Video games 
Jeremy was featured as a playable character in the 2003 video game Celebrity Deathmatch video game. His image was used as a fairy in the 2004 video game Leisure Suit Larry: Magna Cum Laude, in which he gives tips and advice to the main character. Jeremy also stars in the 2008 video game BoneTown as the king of Bonetown and sex god. Jeremy appears in the 2011 video game Postal III as Raul Chomo, the mayor of the fictional town of Catharsis, Arizona.

Video 
Jeremy appeared in a series of viral video spoofs for video sharing website Heavy.com. The videos lampooned include Britney Spears, lonelygirl15, Little Superstar and others. In 2007 he had a cameo appearance in "The Plot to Bomb the Panhandle" video, by the band A Day to Remember. In addition, Jeremy appeared on an episode of Gorgeous Tiny Chicken Machine Show, titled "Pamous Movie Star".

In January 2009, Jeremy appeared with David Faustino (Bud Bundy from Married... with Children) in an episode of Faustino's show Star-ving, which airs on Crackle, as does the Gorgeous Tiny Chicken Machine Show. In June 2009, he did a cameo in the music video "10 Miles Wide" by Escape The Fate, along with Dennis Hof and other adult video performers. In December 2010, Jeremy starred in the Break.com video Tron Jeremy, a parody of the film Tron: Legacy. In October 2013, Jeremy appeared in Bart Baker's parody of Miley Cyrus's "Wrecking Ball".

Books 
Jeremy released his memoir, titled Ron Jeremy: The Hardest (Working) Man in Showbiz, in February 2007. The book was published by HarperCollins.

Businesses
In June 2009, Jeremy and business partner Paul Smith opened Ron Jeremy's Club Sesso, a swingers nightclub located in the financial district of downtown Portland, Oregon. The club was closed on June 20, 2015, over legal problems with the city.

Jeremy is also involved in the marketing of a line of rum "Ron de Jeremy" to which he lent his name ("ron" being Spanish for "rum"). Television ads for the rum featuring Jeremy proclaim that it's rum "Ron Style".

Personal life 

On January 29, 2013, Jeremy drove himself to Cedars-Sinai Medical Center after experiencing severe chest pain. Doctors discovered an aneurysm near his heart and he was operated on the following day. Three weeks later, he was released from the hospital.

Sexual assault allegations

More than a dozen women have publicly accused Jeremy of sexual assault. Several of the allegations relate to his appearances at fan conventions, alleging that he would grope and insert his fingers into attendees without their consent. The organizers of the Exxxotica national adult conventions permanently banned Jeremy from their shows in October 2017 after a June 2017 social media campaign by webcam model Ginger Banks. Due to the allegations, the Free Speech Coalition, an industry trade group, rescinded its Positive Image Award, which it had presented to him in 2009.

In June 2020, Jeremy was charged with four counts of rape and sexual assault by the Los Angeles County District Attorney's Office. Jeremy was accused of raping a 25-year-old woman at a home in West Hollywood in May 2014. He also allegedly sexually assaulted two women, ages 33 and 46, on separate occasions at a West Hollywood bar in 2017, and is accused of raping a 30-year-old woman at the same bar in July 2019. Many of the alleged assaults occurred at the Rainbow Bar and Grill where Jeremy was a regular. Owner of Golden Artists Entertainment, Dante Rusciolelli, announced they were dropping Jeremy as a client following the charges. On June 27, Jeremy pleaded not guilty to all charges. Jeremy posted his response to the charges on Twitter saying: "I am innocent of all charges. I can't wait to prove my innocence in court! Thank you to everyone for all the support."

Three days after Jeremy was initially charged, prosecutors said they had an additional 25 allegations of misconduct involving Jeremy had been made, 13 of which had occurred in Los Angeles County. Subsequently, six additional women who worked in the adult entertainment industry came forward stating that Jeremy had raped or abused them. In July 2020, a law enforcement official confirmed that the Los Angeles County Sheriff's Department had received 30 new allegations of forcible rape and groping against Jeremy involving incidents that took place in Los Angeles County since 2000.

In August 2020, Los Angeles prosecutors filed 20 further counts against Jeremy, including charges of rape, sexual assault, sodomy, and forcible penetration by foreign object against Jeremy. The charges involved 12 different women ranging in age from 15 to 54 years old in incidents from 2004 to 2020. One woman stated that Jeremy sexually assaulted her at a party in Santa Clarita in June 2004 when she was 15. The most recent incident is said to have occurred on January 1, 2020, when a 21-year-old woman said that Jeremy sexually assaulted her outside of a business in Hollywood. Six other women accused Jeremy of sexually assaulting them inside a West Hollywood bar he frequented, and another woman said that he assaulted her in the bar’s parking lot. Jeremy, who originally had bail set at $6.6 million when first charged in June, was placed into custody at Twin Towers Correctional Facility. On August 25, 2021, he was indicted on a total of 30 sexual-assault counts involving 21 women.

The BBC documentary Ron Jeremy: Fall of a Porn Icon charting the history of allegations against Ron Jeremy and featuring interviews with some of Ron Jeremy's alleged victims, including Ginger Banks and Tana Lee, premiered in November 2021.

On March 17, 2022, Jeremy's trial was suspended pending a mental health examination, after Jeremy was reported to be "incoherent" and unable to recognize his own lawyer, and was subsequently transferred to a mental health facility.

On January 17, 2023, Jeremy was found by the judge to be mentally unfit to stand trial due to "incurable neurocognitive decline". A hearing was scheduled for February 2023 on whether to transfer Jeremy to a state-run hospital.

On February 8, 2023, Jeremy was committed to a state mental health facility in California after being found incompetent to stand trial on rape and other charges, with a progress report hearing scheduled for May 8, 2023. Per California law, Greg Risling, a spokesperson for the Los Angeles district attorney's office, stated that Jeremy can be committed for up to two years.

Filmography

Awards 
 1983 AFAA Award – Best Supporting Actor (Suzie Superstar)
 1984 AFAA Award – Best Supporting Actor Award (All the way in)
 1986 AVN Award – Best Supporting Actor—Film (Candy Stripers II)
 1991 AVN Award – Best Supporting Actor—Video (Playin' Dirty)
 2004 AFWG Award – Crossover Performer of the Year
 2004 FICEB Award – Best Actor (The Magic Sex Genie – International film group)
 2006 F.A.M.E. Award – Favorite Adult Actor

See also 
 Golden Age of Porn
 Porn Star: The Legend of Ron Jeremy
 Harvey Weinstein

Bibliography 
 Ron Jeremy: The Hardest (Working) Man in Showbiz. Memoir, published in February 2007, by HarperCollins.

References

External links 

 
 
 
 Ron Jeremy profile in The New York Observer
 Audio Interview w/ 'The Rafferty/Mills Connection' (2009)
 World News, Jennifer Abbott, Director interviews Ron Jeremy

1953 births
Living people
Jewish American male actors
American male pornographic film actors
Participants in American reality television series
Pornographic film actors from New York (state)
People from Queens, New York
Queens College, City University of New York alumni
Contestants on American game shows
People from Bayside, Queens
American stand-up comedians
American male comedians
21st-century American comedians
Jewish American male comedians
People detained in psychiatric hospitals
People stripped of awards
21st-century American Jews